"Urban Mermaid" is the 9th single of Japanese artist Yuna Ito released on October 24, 2007 under Studioseven Recordings.

Track list
CD
 Urban Mermaid  CM: LUX (Shampoo)
 Colorful  Theme Song: Fuji TV Network
 Mahaloha: Gira Mundo"City Lights at Night"Remix
 Urban Mermaid: Instrumental

DVD
 Three performances from Yuna Ito 1st Live Tour: Heart
 I'm Here
 Workaholic
 Precious: Encore

Charts

Oricon Sales Chart (Japan)

External links
https://web.archive.org/web/20100826031406/http://www.yunaweb.com/

2007 singles
Yuna Ito songs
2007 songs